Nosy Berafia is an island off the north west coast of Madagascar. It is the largest island in the Radama Archipelago. It is around 10 km long and 3 km wide. Its chief town is Antananabe, which houses the Mahabo royal tombs. Most people on the island are fishermen. There are also many coffee, mango, and jackfruit plantations on the island.

Islands of Madagascar
Geography of Madagascar